

Events

January events 
 January 5 – The Festiniog Railway in North Wales officially opens to passengers, the first narrow gauge railway in the British Isles to do so.
 January 10 – The California Pacific Railroad absorbs the Sacramento and San Francisco Rail Road Company and the San Francisco and Marysville Rail Road Company.

February events
 February – The Confederate States of America authorize military control of railroads for the American Civil War.
 February 4 – The assets of Dayton, Xenia and Belpre Railroad in Ohio are sold in bankruptcy proceedings and split between the Little Miami Railroad and Columbus and Xenia Railroad.
 February 9 – The Colorado and Clear Creek Railroad, predecessor to the Colorado Central Railroad, is chartered.
 February 15 – The Chicago and North Western Railway and Galena and Chicago Union Railroad merge.

March events 
 March – The Central Pacific Railroad hires agents to recruit thousands of Chinese workers from Guangdong Province. 
 March 17 – The Jackson and Woodin Manufacturing Company shops in Berwick, Pennsylvania, are destroyed by fire.

April events
 April – The funeral train for Abraham Lincoln travels from Washington, D.C., to Illinois.

May events
May – Opening of Talyllyn Railway in Wales.
May 5 – The first train robbery in the United States takes place, in North Bend, Ohio (a suburb of Cincinnati), committed by armed guerillas from the American Civil War.
May 25 – The first steel rails are rolled at a foundry in Chicago from Bessemer steel made in blast furnaces in Wyandotte, Michigan.

June events
June 7 – The Rednal rail crash in England, a derailment at a permanent way work site, kills thirteen.
June 9 – The Staplehurst rail crash in England, a derailment at a permanent way work site, kills ten and injures 49; Charles Dickens is amongst the survivors.
July 31 – Opening of the narrow gauge main line from Ipswich to Grandchester, Queensland, Australia.

August events 
 August 7 – The Lawrence Railroad and Transportation Company, with tracks in Pennsylvania and Ohio, is reorganized as the Lawrence Railroad Company.

September events
 September 1 – The English company John Trevor-Barkley begins construction on the Bucharest–Giurgiu line, the first railroad line built in the territory of Romania.
 September 13 – Algernon S. Buford becomes president of the Richmond and Danville Railroad.
 September 14 – The Brockville and Ottawa Railway begins operations between Arnprior and Sand Point, Ontario, a distance of about 6 miles (10 km).

October events
 October 2 – First section of Sri Lanka Railways, at this time known as Ceylon Government Railways, officially opens from Colombo to Ambepussa on 5 ft 6in (1676 mm) gauge.
 October 18 – Almelo railway station in the Netherlands is opened.

December events 
 December 20 – Alkmaar railway station in the Netherlands is opened.

Unknown date events

 The United Kingdom Institution of Civil Engineers forms the Engineer and Railway Staff Corps.
 The Union Pacific Railway, later to become the Missouri–Kansas–Texas Railroad and not to be confused with the Union Pacific Railroad, begins operations.
 A group of businessmen in San Francisco, led by Timothy Guy Phelps, found the Southern Pacific Railroad to build a rail connection between San Francisco and San Diego.
 Erastus Corning resigns from his executive post for the New York Central Railroad.
 The Canadian Engine and Machinery Company, predecessor of the Canadian Locomotive Company, is founded from the assets of the bankrupt Kingston Locomotive Works.
 Missouri Car and Foundry Company, later to become part of American Car and Foundry, is founded in St. Louis, Missouri.
 Pittsburgh & Steubenville Extension Railroad Tunnel opens for rail service.

Births

March births 
 March 2 – Frederick Methvan Whyte, mechanical engineer for the New York Central Railroad, creator of Whyte notation for the classification of steam locomotives (d. 1941).

October births
 October 9 – George Hughes, Chief Mechanical Engineer for the Lancashire and Yorkshire Railway 1904–1922, the London and North Western Railway 1922–1923 and the London, Midland and Scottish Railway 1925–1931 (d. 1945).

Deaths

Unknown date deaths
 William T. James, American inventor of the link motion and spark arrester (b. 1786).

References

Further reading